Swizzle or swizzling may refer to:

Human movement
 Swizzle (acro dance), a type of movement for two people in acro dance
 Swizzle (figure skating), a type of movement in figure skating

Computer science
 Swizzling (computer graphics), a method of rearranging the elements of a vector
 Pointer swizzling, the manipulation of object references

Other uses
 Swizzle stick, a device used for stirring drinks
 Rum Swizzle, a type of cocktail